Zeppelin LZ 38 (designated LZ 38) was Zeppelin P Class airship of the German Imperial Army. It was the first to bomb London, United Kingdom.

Operational history

Airship LZ 38 was the first of the new P class, of which a total of 21 were built for the army and navy by the end of 1915. With this increase in size the diameter of the ships and their gas volume lift power also increased considerably. With this added lift the Zeppelin was then equipped with four engines.

The first P class Zeppelin constructed was LZ 38, assigned to the Army and first flown on 3 May 1915. LZ 38 was first used on the Eastern Front with the Königsberg and Schneidemühl locations and then moved to Düsseldorf and Brussels-Evere in early May 1915 for use in the West.

After a series of raids on the East coast of England it attacked London.  In total it carried out five raids on England.

May 31, 1915 Raid
LZ 38 became the first airship to bomb London on 31 May 1915, dropping  of bombs on the eastern suburb of London, killing seven people.  A consequence of this raid was that reporting restrictions were introduced in England.  Formerly press coverage contained detailed accounts of the location of bombing raids: after this, only generalised locations were published. The first bomb, an incendiary, was dropped on 16 Alkham Road. Moving south it dropped eight more bombs. Its ninth landed on 33 Cowper Road setting the house on fire killed 3-year-old Elsie Leggatt and her 11-year-old sister, Elizabeth May. The next incendiary set fire to 187 Balls Pond Road causing the death of the married couple, Henry and Caroline Good in the resulting flames. Steering away from the Tower of London, and, over Whitechapel LZ 38 dropped another explosive on Christian Street: 8-year-old Samuel Reuben and 16-year-old Leah Lehrman were killed. The seventh and last victim was Eleanor Willis, 67, who died of shock two days later. In total Zeppelin LZ 38 dropped 91 incendiaries, 28 explosive bombs and 2 grenades.

Destruction

It was destroyed when its shed at Evere was bombed on 7 June 1915.

Specifications (LZ55 / P-class zeppelin)

See also

List of Zeppelins

References

Bibliography 
 - Total pages: 221 

  

Accidents and incidents involving balloons and airships
Accidents and incidents involving military aircraft
Airships of the Imperial German Navy 
1910s German bomber aircraft
Hydrogen airships
Zeppelins
Airships of Germany
Airships
Aircraft first flown in 1915